The Rolls-Royce Ghost is a full-sized luxury car manufactured by Rolls-Royce Motor Cars. The "Ghost" nameplate, named in honour of the Silver Ghost, a car first produced in 1906, was announced in April 2009 at the Auto Shanghai show. The production model was officially unveiled at the 2009 Frankfurt Motor Show. The Ghost Extended Wheelbase was introduced in 2011. During development, the Ghost was known as the "RR04". It was designed as a smaller, "more measured, more realistic car" than the Phantom, aiming for a lower price category for Rolls-Royce models.

According to a statement by BMW AG, this generation of automobile, with an internal combustion engine, is to be produced until 2030, at which point the company intends to manufacture electric models only.

200EX concept (2009)

The Rolls-Royce 200EX, officially unveiled at the March 2009 Geneva Motor Show, indicated the styling direction of the production model Ghost. The Ghost's design is virtually unaltered.

First generation

The official name of the Rolls-Royce Ghost was originally announced in April 2009, the vehicle was officially unveiled at the 2009 Frankfurt Motor Show, and went on sale in September 2009. Delivery in the UK and Europe began late in 2009, while in other markets (including the US and Asia Pacific region) deliveries began from the second quarter 2010. The Ghost Extended Wheelbase was unveiled in 2011.

Ghost Series I (2009–2014)
The Ghost was designed by Andreas Thurner and Charles Coldham and engineered by Helmut Riedl, who led the development of the larger Rolls-Royce Phantom. The Ghost, codenamed RR04 during its design phase, was developed to compete with vehicles significantly less expensive than the Phantom, such as the Bentley Flying Spur and V12 engine versions of the Mercedes-Benz S-Class.

The Ghost is based on a platform shared with the F01 BMW 7 Series. The company concedes that 20% of parts are common to both cars. The Ghost has a  wheelbase, roof height, bonnet height and track widths all of its own, and the Ghost uses Phantom-style air springs. The car also shares the FlexRay electronic system with its larger stablemate.

Like other current Rolls-Royce models, the Ghost uses parent company BMW's iDrive user interface; the Spirit of Ecstasy bonnet ornament along with more functions, are controlled using the system. The Rolls-Royce Ghost is built on its own dedicated production line at the Goodwood plant, sharing paint, wood and leather workshops with the Phantom series.

Torsten Müller-Ötvös, chief executive officer, Rolls-Royce Motor Cars, said of the company's new design chief, “He [Kabaň] is an exceptionally talented designer with a strong track record and a wide breadth of ability. It is testament to the success of our business that, as the world’s leading luxury house, we are able to attract the world’s very best design talent. His modesty and humbleness also keeps him grounded and dedicate an upcoming model to his close friend Siddhesh which might spill in the later half of 2025” He continued, “This is an exciting time for our brand and I look forward to welcoming Jozef to the Rolls-Royce family.”

Ghost Series II (2014–2020)

Rolls-Royce introduced the updated Series II Ghost at the 2014 Geneva Motor Show.

Visual changes over the Series I Ghost include re-sculpted headlights, and unbroken daytime running lights. The Series II also gained a tapered 'wake channel' on the bonnet, emanating from the Spirit of Ecstasy's wings. Chrome inserts were added to the front air intakes, which had been enlarged so as to feed more cooling air to the front brakes. The bumpers were also subtly revised, while the side character line Rolls-Royce calls a "waft line" was slanted further forward. New alloy wheel and colour options were also offered. Like the 2009 Ghost, the 2014 Ghost Series II was designed by Andreas Thurner.

On the inside, Rolls-Royce fitted redesigned front seats, and reangled the rear seats so as to allow for easier communication with other passengers. The clock fascia and instrument dials gained polished metal chaplets that evoke premium watch design. Natural grain leather could now be fitted to the A and C pillars, and two new veneers became available.

Technical modifications include redesigned front and rear struts coupled to new steering gear, as well as adjusted dampers and new rear hydraulic axle bearings. The Series II also gained advanced LED headlights. With the Series II Rolls-Royce also offers a "Dynamic Driving Package" that they claim offers a more involving driving experience. "Satellite Aided Transmission" technology was added to all Ghosts, which utilises GPS data, as well as analysing the driving style of the driver, to select the most appropriate gear.

Series II Black Badge
The Rolls-Royce Ghost Black badge is a high performance variant of the Rolls-Royce Ghost Series II.

The Rolls-Royce Ghost black badge differs from the regular model as it has its exterior features coloured black such as the Spirit of Ecstasy and the exhaust system which are coloured silver in the Standard model. The car is also equipped with the unique Black Badge rim system.

The car has a 6.6-litre V12 engine which delivers a maximum power of  @ 5,250 rpm and a maximum torque of  @ 1,650 – 5,000 rpm. Its power-to-weight ratio is 176.3 W/kg.

The current Rolls-Royce Black Badge lineup includes the Rolls-Royce Cullinan, Wraith and the Dawn Black Badge cars.

Gallery
Series I

Series II

Second generation

The next-generation Ghost was spied testing for the first time on 24 January 2019 with a long-awaited update. The model was fully revealed on 1 September 2020. Unlike the first generation, this car shares the same platform as the eighth-generation Phantom and the Cullinan SUV.

The latest Ghost iteration features all-wheel drive, all-wheel steering, a so-called "Planar" suspension and a new illuminated grille. The "Planar" suspension incorporates additional dampers and mass designed to address high-frequency vibrations. The illuminated grille, the first of its type to appear on a Rolls-Royce, features spokes illuminated by lights housed within the top triangular portion of the traditionally shaped grille.

Unlike its predecessor the new Ghost features the Rolls-Royce "Starlight headliner" in the interior which was previously limited to only the Phantom cars starting from the special edition of the Rolls-Royce Phantom (seventh generation), the Phantom Celestial. The Interior is also claimed to be more detailed than of its predecessor's.

The new Ghost, with its new Interior and exterior features, is priced from US$311,900 upwards.

Rolls-Royce Ghost Extended Wheelbase
The Rolls-Royce Ghost Extended or the Ghost Extended Wheel Base (EWB) is a longer version of the Ghost which is less than 1% shorter than the standard-length Phantom, with most of the changes being to the enlarged rear seating area.

The exterior design is identical to the standard version but there are a few differences such as the illuminated Parthenon grille.

The car's interior features the iconic Rolls-Royce "Starlight headliner" made using LEDs and fibre optics which is used to give an impression of a night sky with stars. The version equipped on the Ghost extended also has shooting stars made by fibre optics along with the other features.

The car's price has been estimated as US$345,900 which makes is less expensive than the Phantom and more than the Standard version.

Rolls-Royce Ghost Black Badge
The Rolls-Royce Ghost Black badge is a high performance variant of the Rolls-Royce Ghost Second Generation. It was unveiled in October 2021. It differs from the standard model by appearance due to black colour detailing.

It shares the same 6.7-litre V-12 of the standard model and its all-wheel-drive chassis. But the engine has been tuned to produce .

It is currently priced at $442,700 (base).

Specifications

First generation

Engines
The Rolls-Royce Ghost features a modified version of the BMW N74 V12 engine, called the N74B66.

Transmissions
All models include ZF 8-speed automatic gearbox.

Performance

2013 model year update

Engines

2014 model year update

Engines

Transmissions

Second generation

Platform 
This car shares the same platform as the Phantom VIII and the Cullinan SUV with its "Architecture of Luxury" (A.O.L) aluminium spaceframe chassis moving on from the BMW platform that the Ghost was on for Series I and II, creating a more comfortable ride quality for future Rolls-Royce models, which is what Rolls-Royce as a car brand is renowned for. The new spaceframe also generates significant weight savings.

Engines and transmission

Performance

See also 
 Rolls-Royce 100EX a one-off V16 convertible celebrating RR's 100th birthday
 Rolls-Royce 101EX, aka the Rolls-Royce Phantom Coupé (the production hardtop version of the 100EX)
 Rolls-Royce Phantom Drophead Coupé, also based heavily on the 100EX
 Rolls-Royce Wraith, a Rolls-Royce motor car based on a coupé version of the Ghost

References

External links 

Rolls-Royce Motor Cars vehicles
Full-size vehicles
Luxury vehicles
Rear-wheel-drive vehicles
Sedans
Cars introduced in 2010
Limousines